Anthony Alfred Alaimo (March 29, 1920 – December 30, 2009) was a United States district judge of the United States District Court for the Southern District of Georgia.

Education and career

Born in Termini Imerese in Sicily, Italy, Alaimo received a Bachelor of Arts degree from Ohio Northern University in 1940, and then served as an aviator in the United States Army Air Corps during World War II, from 1941 to 1945. He achieved the rank of Second Lieutenant. Alaimo spent much of World War II as a prisoner of war, captured after the plane he was co-piloting was shot down.

After the war, Alaimo received a Juris Doctor from Emory University School of Law in 1948 and entered the private practice of law in Atlanta, Georgia from 1948 to 1957, and in Brunswick, Georgia from 1957 to 1971.

Federal judicial service

On November 29, 1971, President Richard Nixon nominated Alaimo to a new seat on the United States District Court for the Southern District of Georgia created by 84 Stat. 294. He was confirmed by the United States Senate on December 2, 1971, and received his commission on December 9, 1971. He served as Chief Judge from 1976 to 1990, and assumed senior status on July 1, 1991, serving in that role until his death. Alaimo was also a member of the Judicial Conference of the United States from 1990 to 1993.

The pace of Alaimo's court earned it the nickname "the Rocket Docket."

Death

Alaimo died on December 30, 2009, after being admitted to a Southeast Georgia Health System hospital in Brunswick, Georgia for treatment of an undisclosed condition. He was 89 years old.

References

Sources
 Anthony Alaimo receives an honorary degree at the age of 89
 
 Coppola, Vincent. 2009. The Sicilian Judge: Anthony Alaimo, an American Hero. Macon, GA: Mercer University Press.

1920 births
2009 deaths
Georgia (U.S. state) lawyers
Judges of the United States District Court for the Southern District of Georgia
United States district court judges appointed by Richard Nixon
20th-century American judges
Ohio Northern University alumni
Emory University School of Law alumni
People from Brunswick, Georgia
Military personnel from Georgia (U.S. state)
United States Army Air Forces officers
United States Army Air Forces pilots of World War II
American people of Italian descent
Italian emigrants to the United States